Mähe is a subdistrict in the district of Pirita, Tallinn, the capital of Estonia. It has a population of 5,957.

Gallery

See also
Kloostrimets

References 

Subdistricts of Tallinn